
Year 557 (DLVII) was a common year starting on Monday (link will display the full calendar) of the Julian calendar. The denomination 557 for this year has been used since the early medieval period, when the Anno Domini calendar era became the prevalent method in Europe for naming years.

Events 
 By place    

 Europe 
 The Avars arrive in the northern region of the Caucasus, between the Black Sea and the Caspian Sea. They send envoys to the Byzantines in Lazica (modern Georgia). Like the Huns, the Avars are the former elite of a central Asian federation, which has been forced to flee westwards.

Byzantine Empire
 December 14 – The 557 Constantinople earthquake occurs.

 Asia 
 The Western Wei Dynasty ends: Yuwen Hu deposes emperor Gong Di, and places Yuwen Tai's son Xiaomin on the throne. Yuwen Hu becomes regent and establishes the Northern Zhou dynasty in China. 
 Ming Di is made emperor, after his younger brother Xiao Min Di is arrested while trying to assume power. Xiao Min Di is deposed and executed by Yuwen Hu.
 The Liang dynasty ends: Chen Wu Di, a distinguished general, becomes the first emperor of the Chen dynasty in Southern China.
 The Göktürks under Muqan Qaghan ally with the Persian Empire, and destroy the Hephthalites (White Huns) in Central Asia.

 By topic 
 Religion 
 King Chlothar I of the Franks founds the Abbey of St. Medard at Soissons (Northern France).
 The Jiming Temple in Nanjing is built; the Buddhist pagoda is located near Xuanwu Lake.

Births 
 Dushun, Chinese (Buddhist) patriarch (d. 640)
 Gao Wei, emperor of Northern Qi (d. 577)
 Ouyang Xun, Confucian scholar (d. 641)

Deaths 
 March 14 – Leobinus, bishop of Chartres
exact date unknown
Saint Cyriacus the Anchorite, legendary centenarian (b. 448)
Xiao Min Di, emperor of Northern Zhou (b. 542)

References